The 16th Central American and Caribbean Games were held in Mexico City the capital of Mexico from November 20 to December 3, 1990, and included a total of 4,206 competitors from 29 nations, the largest the games had ever seen.

The 1990 Central American Games in Honduras had been staged in January 1990.

Sports

  Racquetball

Medal table

References
 Meta
 

 
Central American and Caribbean Games, 1990
Central American and Caribbean Games
1990
Central American And Caribbean Games, 1990
1990 in Central American sport
Multi-sport events in Mexico
Sports competitions in Mexico City
1990s in Mexico City
November 1990 sports events in Mexico